Bidar sultanate was one of the Deccan sultanates of late medieval southern India. The sultanate emerged under the rule of Qasim Barid I in 1492 and leadership passed to his sons. Starting from the 1580s, a wave of successions occurred in the rulership of the dynasty which ended in 1609 under the last Sultan Amir Barid III who was eventually defeated in 1619 by the Bijapur sultan Ibrahim Adil Shah II. Bidar became annexed into the Bijapur Sultanate.

History

Qasim Barid and Amir Barid 
The sultanate was founded in 1492 by Qasim Barid I, who was a Turk or Georgian and enslaved by Turks. He joined the service of the Bahmani Sultan Muhammad Shah III. He started his career as a sar-naubat, and was made kotwal of Bidar by Nizam-ul-Mulk Bahri for helping the Deccanis in the massacre of the foreign population at Bidar. However, he later became the mir-jumla (prime minister) of the Bahmani sultanate. During the reign of Mahmood Shah Bahmani II (r. 1482 – 1518), he became the de facto ruler.

After the death of Mahmud Shah Bahmani in 1518, he was succeeded by four sultans, one after another, but they were mere puppets in the hands of Amir Barid.

When the last Bahmani ruler Kalimullah fled to Bidar in 1527, Amir Barid I became practically independent. But he never assumed any royal title.

Ali Barid Shah 
In 1542, Amir was succeeded by his son Ali Barid Shah I, who was the first to assume the royal title of Shah. Ali Barid joined the other Deccan sultans in the Battle of Talikota against the Vijayanagar Empire in January 1565.

Later rulers 
After his death in 1580, Ali Barid was succeeded by his son Ibrahim Barid, who ruled for seven years until his death in 1587. He was succeeded by his younger brother Qasim Barid II. After his death in 1591, he was succeeded by his infant son Ali Barid II, who was soon dethroned by one of his relative, Amir Barid II. In 1601, he was also overthrown by one of his relative, Mirza Ali Barid.

In 1609, he was succeeded by the last ruler, Amir Barid III, who fought against the Mughals in 1616 under the leadership of Malik Ambar. In 1619, he was defeated by the Bijapur sultan Ibrahim Adil Shah II. Bidar was annexed to Bijapur sultanate. Amir Barid III and his sons were brought to Bijapur and kept "under surveillance".

Culture 
The rulers patronized Persianate culture. Persian poetry is inscribed on their tombs.

Architecture

The Bidar Sultanate made considerable additions to the Bidar Fort. Their tombs are also located at Bidar. The rulers employed Hindu architects and engineers for the construction of these buildings, which resulted in amalgamation of some Hindu features within the architecture of this period.

Rulers

Gallery

See also
List of Shi'a Muslims dynasties
Battle of Talikota

References

Citations

Bibliography

External links
 

States and territories established in 1489
States and territories disestablished in 1619
 
Sunni dynasties
Deccan sultanates